Golbahar (also Romanized as Golbahār) is a planned city in Golbahar District, Golbahar County, Razavi Khorasan Province, Iran. Golbahar, along with Binalood, is one of the planned cities of Razavi Khorasan Provnice. Golbahar is located 35 kilometers northwest of Mashhad metropolis near Chenaran. The new city of Golbahar was built to accommodate the excessive population of Mashhad. This city leads from the south to the Binalud Mountain Range and from the north to the Hezar Masjed Mountains and the Kashafrud River.

See also 

 Razavi Khorasan Province
 Mashhad
 Chenaran
 Binalood

References

External links 

 http://golbaharnews.com/

Populated places in Chenaran County
Cities in Razavi Khorasan Province